The Liberal Reformist Party ( or PRL), formerly Liberal Party of the Dominican Republic ( or PLRD) is a liberal  political party in the Dominican Republic. The party was originally named La Estructura, the name under which it contested the 1986 general elections as part of an alliance with the defeated Dominican Revolutionary Party. For the 1990 elections it changed its allegiance to the victorious Social Christian Reformist Party. For the 2006 elections it was part of the victorious Progressive Bloc.

References

Liberal parties in North America
Political parties in the Dominican Republic